The Richards equation represents the movement of water in unsaturated soils, and is attributed to Lorenzo A. Richards who published the equation in 1931. It is a quasilinear partial differential equation; its analytical solution is often limited to specific initial and boundary conditions. Proof of the existence and uniqueness of solution was given only in 1983 by Alt and Luckhaus.  The equation is based on Darcy-Buckingham law representing flow in porous media under variably saturated conditions, which is stated as

where 
 is the  volumetric flux;
 is the  volumetric water content;
 is the liquid pressure head, which is negative for unsaturated porous media;
 is the unsaturated hydraulic conductivity;

Considering the law of mass conservation for an incompressible porous medium and constant liquid density, expressed as

,
where 
 is the sink term [T], typically root water uptake.

Then substituting the fluxes by the Darcy-Buckingham law the following mixed-form Richards equation is obtained:

.

For modeling of one-dimensional infiltration this divergence form reduces to

.

Although attributed to L. A. Richards, the equation was originally introduced 9 years earlier by Lewis Fry Richardson in 1922.

Formulations
The Richards equation appears in many articles in the environmental literature because it describes the flow in the vadose zone between the atmosphere and the aquifer. It also appears in pure mathematical journals because it has non-trivial solutions. This can be easily resolved by considering constitutive relation , which is known as the water retention curve. Applying the chain rule, the Richards equation may be reformulated as either -form (head based) or -form (saturation based) Richards equation.

Head-based
By applying the chain rule on temporal derivative leads to 
 ,
where   is known as the retention water capacity . The equation is then stated as
.

The head-based Richards equation is prone to the following computational issue: the discretized temporal derivative using the implicit Rothe method yields the following approximation:

This approximation produces an error  that affects the mass conservation of the numerical solution, and so special strategies for temporal derivatives treatment are necessary.

Saturation-based
By applying the [[chain rule],] on the spatial derivative leads to

The equation is then stated as

The saturation-based Richards equation is prone to the following computational issues.

Parametrization
The Richards equation in any of its forms involves soil hydraulic properties, which is a set of five parameters representing soil type. Further the saturated hydraulic conductivity  (which is for non isotropic environment a tensor of second order) should also be provided. Identification of these parameters is often non-trivial and was a subject of numerous publications over several decades.

Limitations
The numerical solution of the Richards equation is one of the most challenging problems in earth science. Richards' equation has been criticized for being computationally expensive and unpredictable  because there is no guarantee that a solver will converge for a particular set of soil constitutive relations.  Advanced computational and software solutions are required here to over-come this obstacle. The method has also been criticized for over-emphasizing the role of capillarity, and for being in some ways 'overly simplistic'   In one dimensional simulations of rainfall infiltration into dry soils, fine spatial discretization less than one cm is required near the land surface, which is due to the small size of the representative elementary volume for multiphase flow in porous media.  In three-dimensional applications the numerical solution of the Richards equation is subject to aspect ratio constraints where the ratio of horizontal to vertical resolution in the solution domain should be less than about 7.

References

See also
 Infiltration (hydrology)
 Water retention curve
 Finite water-content vadose zone flow method
 Soil Moisture Velocity Equation

Soil physics
Hydrology
Partial differential equations